Island of the Fishmen is a 1979 Italian action-horror film directed by Sergio Martino, starring Barbara Bach, Joseph Cotten and Richard Johnson.

In 1981, about 30 minutes of footage was removed from the original film and replaced with new material for international release. This version was given the title Screamers.

Plot

It is the year 1891 and a military doctor, Lieutenant Claude de Ross (Claudio Cassinelli) a survivor of not one, but two shipwrecks, washes ashore on a mysterious, uncharted Caribbean island along with a handful of convicts. When several of these convicts meet unfortunate ends at the hands of the titular fishmen, Claude and the other survivors flee into the jungle, only to encounter the sadistic Edmond Rackham (Richard Johnson) and his beautiful captive Amanda Marvin (Barbara Bach).

Amanda's father, Professor Ernest Marvin (Joseph Cotten), a once-famed biologist, has discovered a way to transform humans into amphibious creatures and controls their every move. Rackham manipulates Marvin into performing the procedure upon both willing and unwilling participants by assuring him that his work is undertaken for purely scientific and humanitarian motives (Marvin hopes to reduce strain on the world food supply by creating a race of people who can live in the resource-untapped ocean). Having discovered the lost city of Atlantis beneath the waters surrounding the island however, Rackham is in actuality using the half-human monsters to plunder the lost city of its treasures.

Shakira (Beryl Cunningham), a voodoo priestess in the employ of Rackham foretells death and destruction descending upon the island.

The priestess' prophecy is fulfilled as the film ends with Claude and Amanda attempting an escape from a gun-wielding Rackham, a crazed Shakira, uncontrolled fishmen and the very volcano that doomed Atlantis which awakens and threatens to send what unsubmerged landmass remains to oblivion.

Cast

Claudio Cassinelli as Lieutenant Claude de Ross
Barbara Bach as Amanda Marvin
Richard Johnson as Edmond Rackham
Joseph Cotten as Professor Ernest Marvin
Beryl Cunningham as Shakira
Franco Iavarone as José
Roberto Posse as Peter
Giuseppe Castellano as Skip
Franco Mazzieri as François

Release
Islands of the Fishmen was released in Italy on January 18, 1979.

Alternate versions

After being acquired by American distributors New World Pictures and United Pictures Organization, Miller Drake was hired to pen and helm a new opening for the film. This prologue featured Cameron Mitchell as a sea captain leading a gentleman (Mel Ferrer) who had squandered his family fortune in search of Atlantean treasure on the island.

This footage contained grisly special make-up effects of fishmen-inflicted wounds created by Chris Walas. Changes to the film itself included the addition of musical cues by Sandy Berman not present in the Italian cut, a new English dub track and a new title, Something Waits in the Dark.

After this 1980 release proved unsuccessful, Jim Wynorski spearheaded New World Pictures' re-release of the film. Wynorski re-titled the film (again) and for this new version, entitled Screamers, a scene of a man being turned inside-out was filmed specifically for inclusion in a trailer designed to lure in audiences who failed to give Something Waits in the Dark much notice.

Both Something Waits in the Dark and Screamers run approximately 85 minutes in length. Roughly half an hour of footage was edited from L'isola degli uomini pesce in order to make room for the above-mentioned stateside additions.

Reception
Gene Siskel of the Chicago Tribune gave the film half of one star out of four and remarked, "'Screamers' (a fresh title for what appears to be an old film) never generates any scream."

Sequel
In 1995, Sergio Martino returned to direct a made-for-Italian-TV sequel titled The Fishmen and Their Queen, a.k.a. Queen of the Fishmen.

References

External links 
 

1979 films
1979 horror films
Films directed by Sergio Martino
Italian action horror films
1970s Italian-language films
Films shot in Sardinia
Films set in 1891
Films set in Atlantis
Films set in the Caribbean
1970s historical horror films
Italian historical films
Films produced by Luciano Martino
Films with screenplays by Sergio Donati
Italian horror films
1970s Italian films